Downtown Victoria is a neighbourhood of Victoria, British Columbia, Canada that serves as the city centre and the central business district for the City of Victoria, and the Greater Victoria regions.

Characteristics

The downtown area is an extremely popular place for tourists and local Victorians as that is where many of the movie theatres, stage theatres, hotels, restaurants, pubs, night clubs, and shops are. Many tourist attractions are located in and around the area including Bastion Square, heart of the 19th-century city's professional district. Centennial Square is next to Victoria City Hall; it is used for small venue events such as the Electronic Music Festival, which takes place during the same time period as the BC Day statutory holiday and Symphony Splash. Market Square, towards the northwest end of downtown, is used for small venue concerts and festivals, containing shopping establishments and eateries and is part of the city's "Old Town".  Just beyond Market Square and Old Town which is the cultural and historic Chinatown which forms part of the northern end of downtown Victoria. It has a colourful Chinese historical past from the early days of Victoria.

Downtown Victoria contains most of Greater Victoria's and the Capital Regional District's urban high rise office towers.

The Bay Centre shopping mall is located in the middle of downtown. Save-On-Foods Memorial Centre, located on the site of the former Victoria Memorial Arena, is the largest sports-entertainment multiplex on Vancouver Island and the second largest in British Columbia outside of the Greater Vancouver area.

Attractions

Places of Interest 

 Bastion Square
 Beacon Hill Park
 Bug Zoo
 British Columbia Parliament Buildings
 Chinatown
 Christ Church Cathedral
 The Fairmont Empress Hotel
 Fan Tan Alley
 Government Street
 Johnson Street Bridge
 Market Square
 Miniature World
 Inner Harbor
 Save-On-Foods Memorial Centre
 Victoria Conference Centre

Events 

 Victoria Film Festival
 Rifflandia Music Festival
 Victoria Ska Fest
 Symphony Splash

Major skyscrapers and buildings 

This list ranks notable highrises in downtown Victoria that stand at least 50 metres (164 ft) tall, based on CTBUH height measurement standards. This includes spires and architectural details but does not include antenna masts.

See also 
 Rogers Building (Victoria, British Columbia)

References

External links 
 Map of Downtown Victoria
 Downtown Victoria Business Association
 Victoria Buzz
 Tourism Victoria

Neighbourhoods in Victoria, British Columbia
Victoria